A president-in-office or chair(man)-in-office (PiO or CiO; French: président en exercice) is the ambassador, foreign minister, or other official of the member state holding the presidency of an international organization, who is the individual actually chairing the meeting of the representatives from member states.

Commonwealth of Nations
The head of government of the host nation of each biennial Commonwealth Heads of Government Meeting (CHOGM) becomes the Chair-in-Office of the Commonwealth of Nations until the next meeting.  His or her main responsibility is to chair the CHOGM itself, but the role may be expanded over the following two years as required.

See also
 Chairmanship of the Organization for Security and Co-operation in Europe
 President-in-Office of the European Council

Footnotes

Diplomacy